Lothar Spiegelberg (born 24 October 1939) is a former German cyclist. He competed in the individual pursuit at the 1964 Summer Olympics.

References

1939 births
Living people
German male cyclists
Olympic cyclists of the United Team of Germany
Cyclists at the 1964 Summer Olympics
Cyclists from Berlin
East German male cyclists